Michael Abington (born 8 March 1965) is an English first-class cricketer. He played in seven first-class matches for Cambridge University Cricket Club in 1992.

See also
 List of Cambridge University Cricket Club players

References

External links
 

1965 births
Living people
English cricketers
Cambridge University cricketers
Sportspeople from Lusaka